HNLMS Abraham van der Hulst was a  of the Royal Netherlands Navy.

Service history

Commissioned into Nazi Germany's Kriegsmarine, first as AM 1 (also listed as MH 1) on 26 August 1940. She sailed for Emden on 30 August, where she was renamed M 553. She was converted to a torpedo recovery vessel in December 1940. In August 1944 she was transferred to the  27th U-boat Flotilla, responsible for the tactical training of U-boats.

Returned to the Royal Netherlands Navy in May 1945 and recommissioned as the Abraham van der Hulst (the Dutch naval authorities apparently thought her to be this ship). She sailed for the Dutch East Indies on 16 September 1946 for service as patrol ship. After returning to Europe, she was rebuilt as boom defence vessel. Struck in 1961 and transferred to the Zeekadetkorps Nederland (Dutch Sea Cadets) in February 1962. Later scrapped.

Jan van Amstel-class minesweepers
Ships built in Rotterdam
1940 ships
World War II minesweepers of the Netherlands
Mine warfare vessels of the Kriegsmarine
Naval ships of the Netherlands captured by Germany during World War II